The Chinese People's Liberation Army Fourth Field Army was a military formation of the People's Liberation Army.  It was formed during the Chinese Civil War by existing members of Eighth Route Army and New Fourth Army stationed in Manchuria along with others, where they fought against the Republic of China government.  The army also incorporated elements of the former Manchurian occupation forces, which included around 30 thousand Japanese troops.  The army was commanded by Lin Biao, and it was involved in many crucial battles including the Liaoshen Campaign.

After the surrender of Japan in 1945, the Northeast People's Autonomous Army was established from the Eighth Route Army that mobilized into Northeast China and local anti-Japanese guerillas.  On January 14, 1946, it was renamed the Northeast Democratic United Forces,  It became the Northeast People's Liberation Army and later the Northeast Field Army in 1948.

The 156th Division was created in November 1948 under the Regulation of the Redesignations of All Organizations and Units of the Army, issued by Central Military Commission on November 1, 1948, based on the 6th Independent Division, Northeastern Field Army, PLA.

After the fall of Tianjin to Communist forces on 14–15 January 1949, the Nationalist garrison in Beiping was effectively isolated. Fu Zuoyi came to the decision to negotiate a peace settlement on 21 January. In the following week, 260,000 Nationalist troops began to exit the city in anticipation of the immediate surrender. On 31 January 1949, the Fourth Field Army entered Beiping to take over the city which marked the conclusion of the Pingjin Campaign.

On March 11, 1949, the Northeastern Field Army was renamed the PLA's Fourth Field Army.  The army comprised the 12th, 13th, 14th, 15th Corps Army, special technical troops, the Column of Guangdong and Guangxi, and the 50th and 51st Corps. William W. Whitson, writing with Chen-Hsia Huang in The Chinese High Command, 1972, lists several armies under the Fourth Field Army in the June–September 1949 period. He writes that the 12th Army comprised the 41st, 42nd, 45th, and 46th Corps, the 13th Army comprised the 38th, 39th, and 49th Corps, and gives the 14th Army as comprising the 48th Corps (142nd, 143rd, and 144th Divisions) and the 54th Corps (160th, 161st, and 162nd Divisions). He lists a commander for the 14th Army, but this differs from seemingly unanimous current consensus that the 14th Army's commander at the time was Liu Yalou. Also part of the Fourth Field Army at the time was the 15th Army, with several subordinate corps. Separate corps may have included the 50th, 51st, 54th, 56th, and 58th.

In July–August 1949, the Fourth Field Army dispatched two Korean-Chinese divisions, the 164th and 166th, into Korea to become part of the initial forces of the Korean People's Army. A third division, the 156th, was reorganised with other smaller units and individual Korean personnel from the other three field armies into the 15th Independent Division, and was transferred to the KPA in April 1950. The 156th and 166th Divisions became the KPA's 7th and 6th Divisions respectively.

On 25 October 1949, Liu Yalou was appointed as the chief of air force in the People's Liberation Army. By 11 November, the air force command was officially formed from the headquarters of the 14th ''bingtuan ("Army").

Also in October, after the Changsha uprising, the Kuomintang Army 1st Corps may have become the 21st Army (52nd, 53rd Corps).

The Fourth Field Army fought in the Bobai Campaign (November–December 1949), and on May 1, 1950, elements, including the 45th Corps, completed the Landing Operation on Hainan Island.

The Fourth Field Army was disbanded in April 1955, after association with the Central Military Region for a period, to form part of the new Guangzhou Military Region.

References 

Land forces units and formations of the People's Republic of China
Field armies of the People's Liberation Army
Military units and formations disestablished in 1955
Military units and formations established in 1949